Hybridization and polyploidy are common phenomena in ferns, and the genus Dryopteris is known to be one of the most freely-hybridizing fern genera. North American botanists recognized early that there were close relationships between many of the species of Dryopteris on the continent, and that these relationships reflected hybrid ancestry. The complex includes six sexual diploid parents (one of which, "D. semicristata", is hypothesized to be extinct), six sexual allopolyploids, and numerous sterile hybrids at various ploidal levels.

Diploid species
Dryopteris intermedia
Dryopteris expansa
Dryopteris goldieana
Dryopteris ludoviciana
Dryopteris marginalis
Dryopteris "semicristata"

Allopolyploid species
Dryopteris carthusiana (D. intermedia × "D. semicristata"; allotetraploid)
Dryopteris campyloptera (D. intermedia × D. expansa; allotetraploid)
Dryopteris celsa (D. goldieana × D. ludoviciana; allotetraploid)
Dryopteris clintoniana (D. cristata × D. goldieana; allohexaploid)
Dryopteris cristata (D. ludovicana × "D. semicristata"; allotetraploid)
Dryopteris filix-mas (progenitors D. caucasica and D. oreades)

Other hybrids
Dryopteris × australis (D. celsa × D. ludoviciana; triploid)
Dryopteris × bootii (D. cristata × D. intermedia; triploid)
Dryopteris × critica (D. borreri × D. filix-mas)
Dryopteris × complexa aggregate (D. filix-mas and D. affinis; tetraploid)
Dryopteris × convoluta (D. cambrensis × D. filix-mas)
Dryopteris × deweveri (D. dilatata × D. carthusiana)
Dryopteris × neo-wherryi (D. goldieana × D. marginalis; diploid)
Dryopteris × triploidea (D. carthusiana × D. intermedia; triploid)

References

 hybrid
Hybrid plants